Rhynchoryza is a genus of plants in the grass family. The only known species is Rhynchoryza subulata, native to Brazil (Rio Grande do Sul), Argentina (Santa Fe, Buenos Aires, Entre Rios, Corrientes, Chaco), Paraguay and Uruguay.

References

Oryzoideae
Monotypic Poaceae genera
Flora of South America
Taxa named by Henri Ernest Baillon
Taxa named by Christian Gottfried Daniel Nees von Esenbeck